This is a list of members of the European Parliament for Estonia in the 2019 to 2024 session.

See 2019 European Parliament election in Estonia for further information on these elections in Estonia.

List 
Marina Kaljurand (Social Democratic Party)
Sven Mikser (Social Democratic Party)
Andrus Ansip (Estonian Reform Party)
Urmas Paet (Estonian Reform Party)
Yana Toom (Estonian Centre Party)
Jaak Madison (Conservative People's Party of Estonia)
A seventh, Riho Terras (Isamaa), will take his seat after Brexit.

References

2019
List
Estonia